Fremont Peak can refer to one of several peaks. In the United States, there are seven peaks with the same name:

References